Deutsche Schule Genf (DSG) is a German international school in Vernier, Switzerland, in the Geneva metropolitan area. It serves levels Kindergarten through Sekundarstufe II (Oberstufe).

Accreditation
DSG's (upper) secondary education (Middle and High School) is not approved as a Mittelschule/Collège/Liceo by the Swiss Federal State Secretariat for Education, Research and Innovation (SERI).

References

External links

  Deutsche Schule Genf
  Deutsche Schule Genf

International schools in Switzerland
Vernier, Switzerland
Geneva
Buildings and structures in the canton of Geneva
Education in Geneva